AFI (abbreviation for A Fire Inside) is an American rock band from Ukiah, California, formed in 1991. Since 1998, it consists of lead vocalist Davey Havok, drummer and backing vocalist Adam Carson, bassist, backing vocalist and keyboardist Hunter Burgan, and guitarist, backing vocalist and keyboardist Jade Puget. Havok and Carson are the sole remaining original members. Originally a hardcore punk band, they have since delved into many genres, starting with horror punk and following through post-hardcore and emo into alternative rock and gothic rock.

AFI has released eleven studio albums, ten EPs, one live album and one DVD. The band first reached substantial commercial success with their fifth album, The Art of Drowning (2000), which peaked at number 174 on the Billboard 200. They then broke into the mainstream with their sixth, Sing the Sorrow (2003), which peaked at number five on the Billboard 200 and remained on the chart for 51 weeks. The album was supported by popular singles "Girl's Not Grey" and "Silver and Cold", both of which peaked at number seven on America's Hot Modern Rock Tracks chart in 2003. "The Leaving Song Pt. II" was also released as a single, reaching number 16 on the chart. Sing the Sorrow was certified Platinum by the RIAA in 2006 and is AFI's best-selling release, having sold over 1.26 million copies .

AFI's seventh album, Decemberunderground (2006), debuted at number one on the Billboard 200 and featured the hit single "Miss Murder", which topped the Hot Modern Rock Tracks chart, reached number 24 on the Billboard Hot 100 and appeared in the video game Guitar Hero III: Legends of Rock. The album was certified Platinum by the RIAA in 2013. Their next three albums, Crash Love (2009), Burials (2013) and AFI (2017), were also successful, peaking at increasing positions on the Billboard 200. An EP, The Missing Man, followed in December 2018. The band released their 11th album, Bodies, on June 11, 2021.

History

Early years (1991–1994)
While still in high school in Ukiah, California, Davey Havok (vocals), Mark Stopholese and Vic Chalker formed a band called AFI in November 1991. At the time, the band did not know how to play any instruments. Stopholese suggested that his friend, Adam Carson (who had a drum set), join the band. Stopholese learned guitar and Chalker learned bass, but Chalker was soon replaced by Geoff Kresge. By the end of October 1992, the band had played their first three shows, generally as an opener for a few other punk bands, including Influence 13, which featured future AFI lead guitarist Jade Puget and frequent collaborator Nick 13. AFI recorded their first EP, Dork (1993), with the now defunct band Loose Change, which also featured Puget.

The band briefly broke up in 1993, when the members left Ukiah to attend different colleges. They decided to commit to AFI full-time after an extremely positive experience and enthusiastic crowd response at a reunion show they played at The Phoenix Theater over Christmas break.

AFI relocated to Berkeley, California and lived in a squat that was a decommissioned fraternity house. Between 1993 and 1995, the band independently released vinyl EPs such as Behind the Times, Eddie Picnic's All Wet and Fly in the Ointment, as well as the compilation EPs This Is Berkeley, Not West Bay, AFI/Heckle, and Bombing the Bay (with Swingin' Utters).

First three albums (1995–1998)

AFI's first full-length album, Answer That and Stay Fashionable was released July 4, 1995, on Wingnut Records. It was co-produced by Doug Sangalang and Rancid (band)'s Tim Armstrong and Brett Reed. The album featured fast and upbeat hardcore songs, with humorous lyrical themes, which are vocalized in songs such as "Nyquil", "Cereal Wars", and "I Wanna Get a Mohawk (But Mom Won't Let Me Get One)". Around this time, they coined the term 'East Bay hardcore' to describe their genre.

AFI signed on to Nitro Records, a record label started by The Offspring's Dexter Holland and Greg K. AFI would remain with the label until the release of the 336 EP (2002). In 1996, they released their second album, Very Proud of Ya.  Two songs from their previous album, "Yurf Rendenmein" and "Two of A Kind", were re-recorded for this album. After several tours in support of the album, Kresge decided to leave the group. His spot was filled by current AFI bassist Hunter Burgan for the remaining album tour dates.

Burgan went on to help AFI record Shut Your Mouth and Open Your Eyes (1997) and was invited to become their full-time bassist. Jade Puget, a former member of Influence 13 and Havok's close friend, also provided background vocals and additional guitar on the album, making it the first to feature all four current members of the band. It is also the first album to be copyrighted to the band's official moniker, A Fire Inside. Subsequently, the A Fire Inside EP (1998) was released, after which Stopholese left the band and was replaced by Puget.

Darker sound and wider reach (1999–2001)

The band's next album, Black Sails in the Sunset (1999), was a musical turning point which featured a darker sound, mixing the band's original hardcore roots with dark romantic influences and an emphasis on a more somber atmosphere and lyrics. The New York Times later referred to this as the point where Havok "developed into a singer and songwriter of substance". During this period, AFI's style was considered punk rock. The influence of death rock and gothic rock was also apparent. Offspring frontman Dexter Holland was featured as a backing vocalist on two tracks.

The All Hallow's E.P. (1999) further explored the horror punk genre, featuring artwork and lyrics containing Halloween themes, including a cover of the Misfits song "Halloween". The song "The Boy Who Destroyed the World" was featured in the video game Tony Hawk's Pro Skater 3, and the single "Totalimmortal" was later covered by The Offspring.

On September 19, 2000, AFI released The Art of Drowning, which debuted on the Billboard Charts at number 174, and peaked at number 9 on the Heatseekers chart. It continued to touch base with the horror punk genre, but expanded into styles that were a departure from previous works. The album featured slower, more melodic songs that were more reminiscent of alternative rock, such as "Ever and a Day" and "6 to 8". Hardcore influences were present, more overtly on some tracks. The album sold over 100,000 copies. "The Days of the Phoenix" was released as a single and video and had some moderate mainstream success, garnering the band more TV and radio airplay. The song reached the UK Singles Chart with its titular EP in 2001, peaking at number 152. The success of The Art of Drowning helped to encourage the band to pursue higher mainstream notoriety.

Mainstream labels and popularity (2002–2007)
In 2002, AFI left Nitro Records. DreamWorks Records artists and repertoire executive Luke Wood signed them to the label following intense interest. Their first album for the label, Sing the Sorrow, was released in 2003. The album opened in Billboards top ten and scored enthusiastic lead reviews in major music magazines. The songs "Girl's Not Grey", "The Leaving Song Pt. II", and "Silver and Cold" had some Billboard chart success and exposed the band to even larger audiences. They were nominated in the 2003 MTV Video Music Awards for the MTV2 award category for the "Girl's Not Grey" video, which came to be their first VMA.

In June 2006, AFI's seventh studio album, Decemberunderground, was released on Interscope Records. The album's first single, "Miss Murder", reached No. 1 on the Billboard Modern Rock Charts. The release reflects the continually changing and growing fan base of the band, and the album debuted as No. 1 on the Billboard charts. The album has been certified Gold by the RIAA for sales of over 500,000 copies of the album. The album's second single, "Love Like Winter", was successful on MTV's Total Request Live and was retired after 40 days on the countdown.

On December 12, 2006, AFI released their first DVD, I Heard a Voice – Live from Long Beach Arena, featuring a live performance shot in Long Beach, California. The performance was later released on December 13, 2007, as a live album, and charted at number 133 on the Billboard 200, and number 16 on the Hard Rock Albums chart. The album was well-received, with punknews.org giving it a four-star rating and commenting that when hearing or seeing the performance "you begin to realize AFI are truly a great live band," and that at some points "Pantera would say turn the noise down."

On July 7, 2007, AFI performed on the American leg of Live Earth. They performed "The Missing Frame", "Love Like Winter", "Miss Murder", and a cover of David Bowie's "Ziggy Stardust".

Maturity and resurgence (2008–2017)
In July 2009, Havok released a statement saying that after two years of writing and recording, an upcoming album titled Crash Love would be released on September 29, 2009. It was recorded with producer David Bottrill (who was later dismissed in favor of Joe McGrath and Jacknife Lee). The first single from the album, "Medicate", was released on August 25, 2009, and reached number 7 on the Billboard Alternative Songs Chart. Another single, "Beautiful Thieves", followed later in the year. Havok called Crash Love "the album by which we'll be remembered". It was the band's first release to make a significantly smaller impact than their previous effort, but peaked at number 12 on the Billboard 200.

From April to June 2013, several teaser videos were released on AFI's website.
The band was announced to play Riot Fest 2013, as well as being signed to Republic Records. A single titled "I Hope You Suffer" was released on July 23, and the title of the album, Burials, was announced. Another single, "17 Crimes", was released on August 6. The third single from the album, titled "The Conductor", was released on September 9. The album was released on October 22, produced by Gil Norton. It peaked at number 9 on the Billboard 200.

In a June 2016 interview with Aggressive Tendencies, Puget confirmed that AFI had begun working on new material for their tenth studio album. On October 27, the band released two new songs via Spotify, "Snow Cats" and "White Offerings".
The band's tenth album, AFI (also known as The Blood Album), was released on January 20, 2017. Puget served as the main producer. The album peaked at number 5 on the Billboard 200. Other singles were released, including "Aurelia" and "Hidden Knives".

Recent releases (2018–present)
On October 26, 2018, the band surprise-released a new single called "Get Dark" on Spotify and iTunes. This was followed by The Missing Man EP on December 7, featuring five new songs.

On March 25, 2020, AFI was announced as a headliner for the Two Thousand Trees Festival on July 10 of the same year. Puget was interviewed by Kerrang! to promote the festival appearance and said that "hopefully at least a couple of songs" from the band's eleventh album would be released by then. On April 27, 2020, Puget said that the album was finished, but that its release date was being pushed back as a result of the COVID-19 pandemic. The next day, it was announced that the Two Thousand Trees Festival was being pushed back to 2021, also due to the pandemic.

On January 15, 2021, the band released the tracks "Twisted Tongues" and "Escape from Los Angeles". On February 25, it was revealed that the album would be called Bodies, and be released on June 11. Along with the announcement, the band revealed two new songs as another joint single, "Looking Tragic / Begging for Trouble". On April 9, "Dulceria / Far Too Near" were released, followed by "Tied to a Tree" on May 25.

Musical style
AFI's music has been classified under many genres of music, including punk rock, hardcore punk,  emo, gothic rock, horror punk,  skate punk, alternative rock, screamo, garage punk, and pop-punk. AFI has often been labeled as "gothic punk" due to the band's appearance, but AFI band members never considered the label accurate. AFI guitarist Jade Puget has said, "Goth-punk isn't a style of music, it doesn't even exist."

AFI's sound has constantly changed. AFI originally were a hardcore punk band. AFI's first three albums, Answer That and Stay Fashionable (1995), Very Proud of Ya (1996), and Shut Your Mouth and Open Your Eyes (1997), all have been described as hardcore punk. AFI's fourth album Black Sails in the Sunset and the band's fifth album The Art of Drowning both have been described as horror punk. AFI's 2003 album Sing the Sorrow is considered post-hardcore and emo. Decemberunderground, which features elements of music genres like electronic, new wave, industrial, punk rock, hardcore punk, and synthpop, is considered alternative rock, post-hardcore and emo. AFI's 2009 album Crash Love is considered alternative rock and pop rock. AFI's 2013 album Burials is considered alternative rock and gothic rock. AFI's 2017 self-titled album, also referred to as The Blood Album, has been described as new wave, post-punk and gothic rock.

Puget, who has produced much of the band's music, stated in 2021:

Influences
In an interview, Davey Havok described the band's influences: "We have many, many influences that span the musical spectrum. Each of us grew up on everything from punk to hardcore to dark '80s UK stuff like The Cure, Bauhaus, Joy Division, and The Sisters of Mercy. And there were rock bands like The Misfits, Samhain, and Danzig and industrial bands like Skinny Puppy, Ministry, Front 242 and Alien Sex Fiend. And we all love The Smiths." AFI have also been influenced by British electronic band Orchestral Manoeuvres in the Dark (OMD), whom Havok said "have and will continue to musically and emotionally inspire" him. Other bands that have influenced AFI include Minor Threat, 7 Seconds, Descendents, Suicide, Germs, Black Flag, Slayer, Metallica, T.S.O.L., D.R.I., State of Alert, and the Angry Samoans.

Legacy
The Sydney Morning Herald has written that AFI have been "hailed as being responsible for bringing back the big '80s rock chorus." The band has received much praise in particular from Alternative Press, which has supported the group since the mid-1990s. The publication rated the band's major label debut, Sing the Sorrow as the most anticipated album of 2003, and noted that it "blew the doors off goth-punk as we knew it". AFI has also been granted responsibility for paving the way for the rise of the visual element of rock bands in the 2000s; in a December 2006 article, Revolver Magazine wrote that "AFI have increased the importance of a band's visual identity and the flair for the theatrical," adding that "when a group like Panic! at the Disco borrows imagery from a movie such as Moulin Rouge!, you have to consider the precedent AFI set when they borrowed cues from Tim Burton's The Nightmare Before Christmas." Shoutmouth.com placed AFI at number 22 on its list of the 25 most influential punk bands, noting that the band "have evolved with each album, showing that a punk band can not only change, but stay true to their sound at the same time. AFI have been on a constant rise through their career, and as such,  out the honors". After Sing The Sorrow release, Yorkshire Evening Post described Havok's voice as one of those "you'll love or hate, but one thing can't be denied, this guy has range beyond belief". Recognized by his trademark flair and vocal style, Havok has been recognized as "a bona fide rock god" by Alternative Press.

In 2003, The Pitch described the band's fan club as a "particularly excitable bunch", adding that "there's also the type of sentiments that put the cult back into cult success, such as links to something called 'the Church of Havok'."

Members

Current
 Davey Havok – lead vocals 
 Adam Carson – drums, backing vocals  
 Hunter Burgan – bass, backing vocals, keyboards, programming 
 Jade Puget – guitars, backing vocals, keyboards, piano, programming, synthesizers 

Former
 Vic Chalker – bass, backing vocals 
 Geoff Kresge – bass, backing vocals 
 Mark Stopholese – guitars 

Timeline

Discography

Studio albums
 Answer That and Stay Fashionable (1995)
 Very Proud of Ya (1996)
 Shut Your Mouth and Open Your Eyes (1997)
 Black Sails in the Sunset (1999)
 The Art of Drowning (2000)
 Sing the Sorrow (2003)
 Decemberunderground (2006)
 Crash Love (2009)
 Burials (2013)
 AFI (2017) 
 Bodies (2021)

References
Footnotes

Citations

External links

 
 

 
Alternative rock groups from California
Punk rock groups from California
Hardcore punk groups from California
Musical groups established in 1991
Musical quartets
Horror punk groups
Interscope Records artists
DreamWorks Records artists
Emo musical groups from California
American gothic rock groups
American post-hardcore musical groups
Nitro Records artists
Adeline Records artists
Rise Records artists
Articles which contain graphical timelines
1991 establishments in California
Skate punk groups
American punk rock groups